Authentik a French language non-literary variant to standard spelling of "authentique" (authentic in English).

Authentik may also refer to: 

Authentik (Jessy Matador album), 2013 album by Jessy Matador
Authentik (Kenza Farah album), 2007 album by Kenza Farah
Authentik (N.T.M album), 1993 First album by N.T.M (Joey Starr and Kool Shen)